Yvonne Margaret Danson (born 22 May 1959 in London, United Kingdom) is a female former road running athlete.

Athletics career
Danson represented England at the 1994 Commonwealth Games in Victoria, Canada, winning the bronze medal in the women's marathon.

Danson achieved her personal best a year later in 1995 at the prestigious Boston Marathon, in a time of 2 hours, 30 minutes and 53 seconds, which earned her 5th place.
Living in Singapore at the time, Danson took up citizenship in order to represent Singapore in international competitions. At the 1995 Southeast Asian Games in Chiang Mai, Thailand, she claimed the silver medal in the marathon. Her time of 2 hours, 34 minutes and 41 seconds remains the Singapore national record. She also set a Singapore national record of 36 minutes 27 seconds in the 10,000 metres at the same Games, winning the bronze medal.

Danson represented Singapore at the 1996 Olympic Games in Atlanta, finishing in 38th place out of a field of 86 runners. She also holds the Singapore national record for the 5,000 metres, having run the distance in 17 minutes 35.3 seconds in Singapore in 1997.

Achievements
All results regarding marathon, unless stated otherwise

References

External links
 
 Profile at iaaf.org
 sports-reference

1959 births
Living people
Athletes from London
Singaporean female long-distance runners
British female long-distance runners
English female long-distance runners
British female marathon runners
English female marathon runners
Olympic athletes of Singapore
Athletes (track and field) at the 1996 Summer Olympics
Commonwealth Games medallists in athletics
Commonwealth Games bronze medallists for England
Athletes (track and field) at the 1994 Commonwealth Games
Singaporean people of English descent
English emigrants to Singapore
People who lost British citizenship
Naturalised citizens of Australia
Southeast Asian Games medalists in athletics
Southeast Asian Games silver medalists for Singapore
Southeast Asian Games bronze medalists for Singapore
Competitors at the 1995 Southeast Asian Games
Medallists at the 1994 Commonwealth Games